John McKechnie was a Scottish amateur football right half who played in the Scottish League for Queen's Park.

Personal life 
McKechnie served in the British Army during the First World War and was discharged in November 1918 due to an injured arm.

Career statistics

References

Year of birth missing
Scottish footballers
Scottish Football League players
British Army personnel of World War I
Place of birth missing
Association football wing halves
Queen's Park F.C. players
Date of death missing